A trống cơm, literally "rice drum", is a kind of traditional barrel-shaped Vietnamese drum, similar to the Chinese yaogu, and the Khmer skor sang na. It is used in the hát bội orchestra. Hát chèo also uses the drum in its repertoire.

Trống cơm is a long cylindrical drum with percussional surfaces at both ends. When stationary, it is placed transverse in front of the performer who would strike at the two ends with his hands. Drumsticks are also used. Trống cơm can be played by a performing arts performances when it is worn with a sash and slung over the shoulders, leaving the drum transverse in front of the abdomen.

The drum earns its name "rice" as a layer of cooked rice is smeared on the surface to "tune" it, similar to how drums in Cambodia and Thailand are tuned. The two surfaces are set five notes apart.

References

Vietnamese musical instruments
Drums